The 1896 New Zealand general election was held on Wednesday, 4 December in the general electorates, and on Thursday, 19 December in the Māori electorates to elect a total of 74 MPs to the 13th session of the New Zealand Parliament. A total number of 337,024 (76.1%) voters turned out to vote.

1896 was the year the limit of £200 was placed on each candidate's campaign spending.

Background
The Liberal government campaigned on a platform that the election was between the people and the "selfish few". The economy stagnated, raising unemployment, which caused support for the Liberals to fall in the cities and they lost many seats, though not enough to be removed from office by the Conservatives. In rural areas, the swing in support was not as large due to the public works and land settlement programmes helping to support the regions. In June 1896 Seddon had replaced Joseph Ward as Finance Minister whilst the latter had resigned after being declared temporarily bankrupt. As such Seddon himself took on the workload of the treasury making him more susceptible to opposition attacks over the economy. He proved to be a cautious financier, budgeting for surpluses while maintaining the spirit of self reliance his predecessor John Ballance had advocated.

Results

Party totals

Votes summary

The table below shows the results of the 1896 general election:

Key

|-
 |colspan=8 style="background-color:#FFDEAD" | General electorates
|-

|-
 | rowspan=3 | Auckland, City of
 | style="background-color:;" |
 | colspan=3 style="text-align:center;background-color:;" |  Thomas Thompson
 | style="text-align:right;" | 2,516
 | rowspan=3 style="background-color:;" |
 | rowspan=3 style="text-align:center;" | Arthur Rosser
|-
 | style="background-color:;" |
 | style="text-align:center;" | Charles Button
 | style="background-color:;" |
 | style="text-align:center;background-color:;" |  James Job Holland
 | style="text-align:right;" | 1,622
|-
 | style="background-color:;" |
 | colspan=3 style="text-align:center;background-color:;" | William Crowther
 | style="text-align:right;" | 1,328
|-

|-
 | rowspan=3 | Christchurch, City of
 | style="background-color:;" |
 | colspan=3 style="text-align:center;background-color:;" | Charles Lewis
 | style="text-align:right;" | 6,570
 | rowspan=3 style="background-color:;" |
 | rowspan=3 style="text-align:center;" | William Whitehouse Collins
|-
 | style="background-color:;" |
 | colspan=3 style="text-align:center;background-color:;" | George Smith
 | style="text-align:right;" | 5,940
|-
 | style="background-color:;" |
 | style="text-align:center;" | William Whitehouse Collins
 | style="background-color:;" |
 | style="text-align:center;background-color:;" | Tommy Taylor
 | style="text-align:right;" | 5,445
|-

|-
 | rowspan=3 | Dunedin, City of
 | style="background-color:;" |
 | style="text-align:center;" | William Hutchison
 | style="background-color:;" |
 | style="text-align:center;background-color:;" | Scobie Mackenzie
 | style="text-align:right;" | 2,132
 | rowspan=3 style="background-color:;" |
 | rowspan=3 style="text-align:center;" | David Pinkerton
|-
 | style="background-color:;" |
 | style="text-align:center;" | David Pinkerton
 | style="background-color:;" |
 | style="text-align:center;background-color:;" | John A. Millar
 | style="text-align:right;" | 547
|-
 | style="background-color:;" |
 | style="text-align:center;" | William Earnshaw
 | style="background-color:;" |
 | style="text-align:center;background-color:;" | Henry Fish
 | style="text-align:right;" | 378
|-

|-
 | rowspan=3 | Wellington, City of
 | style="background-color:;" |
 | style="text-align:center;" | Robert Stout
 | style="background-color:;" |
 | style="text-align:center;background-color:;" | Robert Stout
 | style="text-align:right;" | 475
 | rowspan=3 style="background-color:;" |
 | rowspan=3 style="text-align:center;" | Arthur Atkinson
|-
 | style="background-color:;" |
 | style="text-align:center;" | Francis Bell
 | style="background-color:;" |
 | style="text-align:center;background-color:;" | John Hutcheson
 | style="text-align:right;" | 580
|-
 | style="background-color:;" |
 | style="text-align:center;" | John Duthie
 | style="background-color:;" |
 | style="text-align:center;background-color:;" | George Fisher
 | style="text-align:right;" | 28
|-

|-
 |colspan=8 style="background-color:#FFDEAD" | Māori electorates
|-

|}

Table footnotes:

The election of Thomas Wilford for the electorate of Suburbs of Wellington was declared void by an election petition on the grounds of corrupt and illegal practices. Charles Wilson was elected MP for that electorate following a by-election on 23 April 1897.

Summary of changes
 A boundary redistribution resulted in the abolition of seven seats:
 , held by John A. Millar
 , held by Patrick O'Regan
 , held by Edward Smith
 , held by Frederick Flatman
 , held by William Maslin
 , held by Charles Mills
 , held by Frederic Lang
 At the same time, seven new seats came into being:

Notes

References